The letter Å  (å in lower case) represents various (although often very similar) sounds in several languages. It is a separate letter in Danish, Swedish, Norwegian, Finnish, North Frisian, Low Saxon, Transylvanian Saxon, Walloon, Javanese, Chamorro, Lule Sami, Pite Sami, Skolt Sami, Southern Sami, Ume Sami, and Greenlandic alphabets. Additionally, it is part of the alphabets used for some Alemannic and Austro-Bavarian dialects of German.

Though Å is derived from A by adding an overring, it is considered a separate letter. It developed as a form of semi-ligature of an A with a smaller o above it to denote a long and darker A, a process similar to how the umlaut mark developed from a small e written above certain letters.

Scandinavian languages

Origin

Historically, the å derives from the Old Norse long  vowel (spelled with the letter á), but over time, it developed into an  sound in most Scandinavian language varieties (in Swedish and Norwegian, it has eventually reached the pronunciation ). Medieval writing often used doubled letters for long vowels, and the vowel continued to be written Aa. 

In Old Swedish the use of the ligature Æ and of Ø (originally also a variant of the ligature Œ) that represented the sounds  and  respectively were gradually replaced by new letters. Instead of using ligatures, a minuscule (that is, lower-case) E was placed above the letters A and O to create new graphemes. They later evolved into the modern letters Ä and Ö, where the E was simplified into the two dots now referred to as umlaut. A similar process was used to construct a new grapheme where an "aa" had previously been used. A minuscule O was placed on top of an A to create a new letter. It was first used in print in the Gustav Vasa Bible that was published in 1541 and replaced Aa in the 16th century.

In an attempt to modernize the orthography, linguists tried to introduce the Å to Danish and Norwegian writing in the 19th century. Most people felt no need for the new letter, as the letter group Aa had already been pronounced like Å for centuries in Denmark and Norway. Aa was usually treated as a single letter, spoken like the present Å when spelling out names or words. Orthography reforms making Å official were carried out in Norway in 1917 and in Denmark in 1948. According to Jørgen Nørby Jensen, senior consultant at Dansk Sprognævn, the cause for the change in Denmark was a combination of anti-German and pro-Nordic sentiment. Danish had been the only language apart from German and Luxembourgish to use capitalized nouns in the last decades, but abolished them at the same occasion.

In a few names of Danish cities or towns, the old spelling has been retained as an option due to local resistance, e.g. Aalborg and Aabenraa; however, Ålborg and Åbenrå are the spellings recommended by the Danish Language Board. Between 1948 and 2010, the city of Aarhus was officially spelled Århus. However, the city has reverted to the Aa spelling starting 2011, in a controversial decision citing internationalization and web compatibility advantages.

Icelandic and Faroese are the only North Germanic languages not to use the å. The short variation of Faroese á is pronounced , though.

Use in names
In some place names, the old Aa spelling dominates, more often in Denmark than in Norway (where it has been abolished in official use since 1917). Official rules allow both forms in the most common cases, but Å is always correct. Å as a word means "small river" in Danish, Swedish, and Norwegian and can be found in place names.

In family names, the bearer of the name uses Aa or Å according to their choice, but since family names are inherited they are resistant to change and the traditional Aa style is often kept. For instance, the last name Aagaard is much more common than Ågård. The surname Aa is always spelled with double A, never with the single å. However, given names - which are less commonly inherited - have largely changed to the use of the Å. For instance, in Norway more than 12,000 male citizens spell their name Håkon, while only around 2,500 are named Haakon.

Company names are sometimes spelled with the double A by choice, usually in order to convey an impression of old-fashionedness or traditionality. The double A, representing a single sound, is usually kept in initials e.g. for people whose first, middle, and/or last name begins with the double A. Accordingly, a man named "Hans Aagard Hauge" would spell his initials "H. Aa. H." (not "H. A. H." nor "H. Å. H."), while a woman named Aase Vestergaard would spell her initials "Aa. V." (not "A. V." nor "Å. V.").

Alphabetization

Danish and Norwegian 
Correct alphabetization in Danish and Norwegian places Å as the last letter in the alphabet, the sequence being Æ, Ø, Å. This is also true for the alternative spelling "Aa". Unless manually corrected, sorting algorithms of programs localised for Danish or Norwegian will place e.g., Aaron after Zorro. 

In Danish the correct sorting of aa depends on pronunciation: If the sound is pronounced as one sound it is sorted as Å regardless of the sound is 'a' or 'å'; thus, for example, the German city Aachen is listed under Å, as well as the Danish city Aabenraa. (This is §3 in the Danish Retskrivningsreglerne.)

Swedish 
In the Swedish and Finnish alphabets, Å is sorted after Z, as the third letter from the end, the sequence being Å, Ä, Ö.  This is easiest to remember across the Nordic languages, that Danish and Norwegian follow Z first with E-mutated letters Æ and Ø and then the symbol with a one-stroke diacritic Å.  Swedish and Finnish follow Z with a one-stroke diacritic Å and then a two-stroke (or two-dot) diacritic Ä, Ö.  A combined Nordic sorting mnemonic is Æ, Ø, Å, Ä, Ö.

International transcription
Alternative spellings of the Scandinavian Å have become a concern because of globalization, and particularly because of the popularization of the World Wide Web. This is to a large extent due to the fact that prior to the creation of IDNA system around 2005, internet domains containing Scandinavian letters were not recognized by the DNS, and anyway do not feature on keyboards adapted for other languages. While it is recommended to keep the Å intact wherever possible, the next best thing is to use the older, double A spelling (e.g. "www.raade.com" instead of "www.råde.com"). This is because, as previously discussed, the Å/Aa indicates a separate sound. If the Å is represented as a common A without the overring (e.g. "www.rade.com") there is no indication that the A is supposed to represent another sound entirely. Even so, representing the Å as just an A is particularly common in Sweden, as compared to Norway and Denmark, because the spelling Aa has no traditional use there.

Finnish 

Because the Finnish alphabet is derived from the Swedish alphabet, Å is carried over, but it has no native Finnish use and is treated as in Swedish. Its usage is limited to loanwords (the Finnish academic dictionary Kielitoimiston Sanakirja, about 100000 words, has only one word containing Å: ångström) and names of Swedish, Danish or Norwegian origin. In Finland there are many Swedish-speaking as well as many Finnish-speaking people with Swedish surnames, and many Swedish surnames include Å. In addition, there are many geographical places in the Finnish coastal areas and archipelago that have å in their Swedish names, such as Kråkö and Långnäs, as well as the Finnish autonomic region of Åland, a group of islands midst between Sweden and Finland where almost all natives speak Swedish.

It is not allowed to substitute aa for å in Finnish, as aa is already a common letter combination with the value .

Emilian-Romagnol
In Emilian-Romagnol, å is used to represent the open-mid back unrounded vowel , e.g. Modenese dialect , 
,  "man, woman";

e.g. Bolognese dialect , 
  "Bologna, later".

Walloon 
Å was introduced to some eastern local variants of Walloon at the beginning of the 16th century and initially noted the same sound as in Danish. Its use quickly spread to all eastern dialects, under the cultural influence of Liège and covered three sounds, a long open o, a long close o or a long a, depending on the local varieties. The use of a single å letter to cover such pronunciations has been embraced by the new pan-Walloon orthography, with one orthography for words regardless of the local phonetic variations. The Walloon use of Å became the most popular use outside a Scandinavian language, even being used in the International Phonetic Alphabet drafted by Otto Jespersen.

In standardized writings outside the Liège area, words containing å are written with uh, â or ô.

Istro-Romanian 
The Istro-Romanian alphabet is based on the standard Romanian alphabet with three additional letters used to mark sounds specific only to this language: å, ľ and ń.

Javanese
Javanese uses å (a overring), to indicate open-mid back rounded vowel  together with ó (o acute).

Chamorro 
Å and å are also used in the practical orthography of Chamorro, a language indigenous to the people of Northern Mariana Islands and Guam.

Greenlandic
In Greenlandic, å is not used in native words, but is used in several loanwords from Danish, such as båndoptageri (Danish båndoptager) 'tape recorder'. Like in Danish, å is sorted last in the alphabet.

Symbol for ångström 
The letter "Å" (U+00C5) is also used throughout the world as the international symbol for the non-SI unit ångström, a physical unit of length named after the Swedish physicist Anders Jonas Ångström. It is always upper case in this context (symbols for units named after persons are generally upper-case).

Unicode also has encoded . However, that is canonically equivalent to the ordinary letter Å. The duplicate encoding at U+212B is due to round-trip mapping compatibility with an East-Asian character encoding, but is otherwise not to be used.

On computers

Similarly styled trademarks 
The logo of the Major League Baseball team known as the Los Angeles Angels is a capital "A" with a halo. Due to the resemblance, some Angels fans stylize the name as "Ångels".

The logo of the Stargate series similarly features a stylized A with a circle above it, making it resemble an Å as in Stargåte; in Norwegian,  means "riddle".

Cirque du Soleil's Koozå production uses this character in its logo, although it is pronounced by the main singer as a regular "a".

British producer and singer Låpsley uses it in her stage name.

See also 
Æ
Ø
Ö
Ä
Combining character (A and combining ring above (U+030A), Å å, or o above (U+0366), Aͦ aͦ, resembles Å å)
Á
A with ring above (Cyrillic), a Selkup language letter

Notes

References 
Pettersson, Gertrud (1996), Svenska språket under sjuhundra år: en historia om svenskan och dess utforskande, Lund: Studentlitteratur, 

Danish language
Istro-Romanian language
Norwegian language
Latin letters with diacritics
Swedish language
Vowel letters